Al-Awjam (also written  Al Awjām, Al Ājām, or Ajam al Qatif) is a small city located in the Eastern Province of the Kingdom of Saudi Arabia on the coast of the Persian Gulf. The village lies in far north-eastern corner of the Eastern Province, in a petroleum-rich region near the Ghawar and Qatif oilfields. It has a population of 11,460.

Al-Awjam is located near Qatif, and, like most cities in the region, it is home to a large Shia Muslim population.  This contrasts with the majority of Saudis, who are Sunni. As a result, sectarian tensions exist, especially during the Shia holy day of Ashoura. Conflict has reportedly eased since 2005.

References

Populated places in Eastern Province, Saudi Arabia
Geography of Saudi Arabia